Ashti may refer to:

Places
 Ashti, Solapur, Maharashtra, India
 Ashti, Beed, Maharashtra, India
 Ashti, Gadchiroli, Maharashtra, India
 Ashti, Jalna, Maharashtra, India
 Ashti, Khed, Maharashtra, India
 Ashti, Wardha, Maharashtra, India
 Ashti (Vidhan Sabha constituency)

Other uses
ashti, meaning "peace" in Persian, the reconciliation phase of Qahr and Ashti